The men's synchronized 3 metre springboard competition at the 2018 Asian Games took place on 28 August 2018 at the Gelora Bung Karno Aquatic Stadium.

Schedule
All times are Western Indonesia Time (UTC+07:00)

Results

References

External links
Official website

Men's synchronized 3 metre springboard